"With You" is a 1929 song by Irving Berlin. The lyrics commence: " With you, a sunny day; / Without you, clouds in the sky". The song was sung by Harry Richman and Joan Bennett in the 1930 film Puttin' On the Ritz.

Versions
Guy Lombardo and His Royal Canadians (vocal: Carmen Lombardo) had a popular version in 1930. 
Howdy! by Pat Boone (1957)

References

1929 songs
Songs written by Irving Berlin